George Howard Flint (born February 26, 1937) is a former American football guard who played five seasons with the Buffalo Bills of the American Football League (AFL). Flint played college football at Arizona State University and attended North High School in Phoenix, Arizona. He was also a member of the BC Lions of the Canadian Football League. Flint was an AFL All-Star in 1965. He was a member of the Buffalo Bills teams that won the 1964 and 1965 AFL championships.

References

External links
Just Sports Stats
Fanbase profile

Living people
1937 births
Players of American football from Pennsylvania
American football offensive guards
Arizona State Sun Devils football players
Buffalo Bills players
BC Lions players
American Football League All-Star players
Sportspeople from Erie, Pennsylvania
American Football League players